The Monkey's Bum is a variation of the Modern Defense, a chess opening. Although it may also be loosely defined as any approach against the Modern Defense involving an early Bc4 and Qf3, threatening "Scholar's mate", it is strictly defined by the sequence of moves:

1. e4 g6
2. Bc4 Bg7
3. Qf3 e6
4. d4 Bxd4
5. Ne2 Bg7
6. Nbc3

The Monkey's Bum Deferred is a more respected variation in which White develops their queen's knight before playing Bc4 and Qf3.

Origin
The Monkey's Bum was discovered and championed by IM Nigel Povah in the 1970s during a wave of popularity of the Modern Defence. In 1972, after Keene and Botterill published their book The Modern Defence, Povah began looking for a response to the opening. He happened across the game Ljubojević–Keene, Palma de Mallorca 1971, which started 1.e4 g6 2.d4 d6 3.Bc4 Bg7 4.f4 Nf6 and eventually ended in a draw. Intrigued by Ljubojević's early Bc4, Povah began investigating a rapid assault on f7 with 3.Qf3. When he showed the first few moves to Ken Coates, a friend at Leeds, Coates declared, "If that works then I'm a monkey's bum!" The name stuck. The Monkey's Bum first appeared in print five years later in the British Chess Magazine. Povah wrote an article on the theory of the Monkey's Bum, in which he stated that although he had never yet lost with the variation, it was still "in its infancy".

Analysis
In playing the Monkey's Bum, White's idea is to gain active piece play by a sacrifice of the d4-pawn, much like the Smith-Morra Gambit. In practice however, such compensation proves tenuous in the Monkey's Bum proper, as evidenced by the following game:

Nigel Povah–Shimon Kagan, Birmingham 1977 1.e4 g6 2.Bc4 Bg7 3.Qf3 e6 4.d4 Bxd4 5.Ne2 Bg7 6.Nbc3 Nc6 7.Bf4 Ne5 8.Bxe5 Bxe5 9.Qe3 d6 10.0–0–0 Bd7 11.f4 Bg7 12.g4 a6 13.h4 b5 14.Bb3 a5 15.a4 bxa4 16.Nxa4 h5 17.e5 Nh6 18.exd6 Nxg4 19.Qc5 c6 20.Nd4 Bxd4 21.Rxd4 0–0 22.Nb6 Rb8 23.Nxd7 Qxd7 24.Ba4 Qb7 25.b3 Qb6 26.Qxb6 Rxb6 27.Rc4 Rd8 28.Bxc6 Rxd6 29.Bf3 Ne3 30.Ra4 Rb4 31.Rxa5 Rxf4 32.Bb7 Rb6 33.Ba8 Nf5 34.Kb2 Nxh4 35.Ka3 Nf5 36.c4 Nd4 37.Rb1 Nc2+ 38.Ka2 Nb4+ 39.Kb2 Rb8 40.c5 Nd3+ 0–1

Monkey's Bum Deferred

A much more popular and respected approach against the Modern Defense is the Monkey's Bum Deferred. It has been employed by such notable grandmasters as John Nunn, Sergei Rublevsky and Judit Polgár. It is distinct from the Monkey's Bum proper in that the attempt to create the "Scholar's mate" threat with Bc4 and Qf3 only occurs after White has developed their queen's knight. A typical sequence of the Monkey's Bum Deferred is 1.e4 g6 2.d4 Bg7 3.Nc3 c6 4.Bc4 d6 5.Qf3 (see diagram). Usually White will castle kingside and undertake an attack by means of the pawn thrust f2–f4.

The following spectacular game is probably the most famous success of the Monkey's Bum Deferred and forced it to be considered with respect by the chess world:

Judit Polgár–Alexei Shirov, Donner Memorial, Amsterdam, 1995 1.e4 g6 2.d4 Bg7 3.Nc3 c6 4.Bc4 d6 5.Qf3 e6 6.Nge2 b5 7.Bb3 a5 8.a3 Ba6 9.d5 cxd5 10.exd5 e5 11.Ne4 Qc7 12.c4 bxc4 13.Ba4+ Nd7 14.N2c3 Ke7 15.Nxd6 Qxd6 16.Ne4 Qxd5 17.Bg5+ Ndf6 18.Rd1 Qb7 19.Rd7+ Qxd7 20.Bxd7 h6 21.Qd1 1–0

See also
 List of chess openings

References

External links
British Championships 2000

Chess openings